An Uncertain Place is a 2008 crime novel by the French writer Fred Vargas.

Reception
Christian House of The Independent wrote: "It is a highly entertaining policier but more importantly, as with Conan Doyle, the wacky world Vargas shapes is oddly reassuring: a great remedy to a grey day."

See also
 2008 in literature
 Contemporary French literature

References

2008 French novels
French crime novels
French-language novels
Novels by Fred Vargas
Novels set in Serbia